Fereydoun Farrokhzad (October 7, 1938 – August 3, 1992) was an Iranian showman, host, poet, actor, political activist, singer, humanitarian, and writer. He is best known for his television variety show The Silver Carnation which introduced many artists such as Ebi, Leila Forouhar, Shohreh, Sattar and many more.

Farrokhzad was forced into exile after the Islamic Revolution in 1979. After relocating to Germany, he was  the victim of a murder widely believed to be set up by the Islamic Republic government as part of the chain murders.

Early life and career
Fereydoun Farrokhzad was born in Tehran, to career military officer Colonel Mohammad Bagher Farrokhzad (originally from Tafresh) and his wife Touran Vaziri-Tabar. He was the fourth of seven children (Pooran, Amir (Masoud), Forugh, Fereydoun, Gloria, Mehrdad, and Mehran). After graduating from high school he went to Germany and Austria for his post-secondary education. He received his doctorate in political science from Munich University.

At a young age Fereydoun had a passion for poetry and for singing. He turned that passion to reality in 1962 when he started writing poems in German which were published in two German newspapers. In 1964 he published his collection of poems called "Fasleh Deegar" (Another Season). His book was critically acclaimed and was honored by many German poets. Five months after the release of "Fasleh Deegar", Fereydoun Farrokhzad received the Poetry Award of Berlin. For a couple of years Farrokhzad was a member of the Munich Academy of Poetry. In 1966 he found his way to the Television and Radio of Munich. On Radio he had a comedy and music program which played middle eastern music including music from Iran. On TV he created and produced a show called "Khiyaban-haye Alp" (Alpine Roads). In 1967 he returned to Iran and performed on successful radio and TV shows. His most successful TV show was "Mikhakeh Noghrei" (Silver Carnation), and his radio show which aired every other Friday mornings called "Jom'eh Bazzar" (Friday Bazaar). The TV show was watched by millions of Iranians. On the show Farrokhzad introduced and discovered a number of Iranian artists including Sattar, Shohreh, Shahram Solati, Ebi, Morteza, Rouhi Savoji, Hamid Shabkhiz, Leila Forouhar, Saeed Mohammadi, and various others. After the 1979 revolution, Farrokhzad was imprisoned, then released. He escaped the country and settled in the country of his youth college years, Germany.

Politics and activism

Political views 
According to Voice of America, Farrokhzad was known by his fans as an "educated patriot" who frequently criticized the Islamic Republic and its leaders and who was present during many demonstrations against the clerical government.

Farrokhzad produced a weekly radio show for the "Voice of the Flag of Freedom Organization of Iran," the radio station of the Organization of Kaviyani Banner, an "organization of exiled supporters of the Iranian monarchy." Farrokhzad also acted in a film, I Love Vienna, which was considered by some Iranian authorities as anti-Islamic.

Personal life
Esfandiar Monfaredzadeh claimed that Farrokhzad was homosexual. He said: "His main obstacle was the homosexuality that he was not ashamed of; he knew it and he wanted people to understand it." 

Farrokhzad married and divorced twice. His first marriage took place in 1962, to a German-Polish woman named Ania Buchkowski, whom he met in Oxford. Like Farrokhzad, she had a passion for poetry and theater; it was after meeting her that Farrokhzad started writing poems. The result of this marriage was a son named Rostam. Farrokhzad and Ania later separated and got divorced. In 1974 he married an Iranian woman named Taraneh.

Besides his native language of Persian, he also spoke German.

Death

On the evening of August 3 police officers responded to cries for help at the building where Farrokhzad lived but were unable to identify the apartment where the screams originated from.
On August 8, 1992, Farrokhzad's body was found in the kitchen of his apartment in Bonn, Germany after neighbours reported barking by his two dogs.  Farrokhzad had been killed violently, having been stabbed repeatedly in the face and upper torso. Many urban legends surround Farrokhzad's death, including the widely repeated myth that he was beheaded.

Prior to his murder, Farrokzhad had been involved in producing an opposition radio program and reportedly received death threats. In his show the Royal Albert Hall in London he criticized Khomeini and made fun of Khomeini's obsession with sex in his Ressaleh book, which followed death threats and concerns for him.

According to the U.S. state-funded Voice of America (VOA), the murder was "widely believed to be the work of Iran's Islamic government".

Legacy

Farrokhzad remains a significant Iranian cultural icon whose popular music and television programs continue to be circulated through various media platforms. His murder—a political assassination of a celebrity activist entertainer—is a well known and oft-cited event amongst Iranians.

Filmography

Film

See also

 List of unsolved murders
 Forugh Farrokhzad
 Mina Assadi
 Simin Behbahani

References

External links

 Fereydoun Foundation on Official Farrokhzad Foundation Website 
 Farrokhzad's biography on BBC
 
 Farrokhzad's documentaries 
 Radio Farda investigation documentary.

1938 births
1992 murders in Germany
1992 deaths
20th-century Iranian male actors
20th-century Iranian poets
20th-century Iranian male singers
Caltex Records artists
Deaths by stabbing in Germany
Exiles of the Iranian Revolution in Germany
Iranian democracy activists
Iranian dissidents
Iranian emigrants to Germany
Iranian male actors
Iranian male poets
Iranian people murdered abroad
Iranian pop singers
Iranian radio actors
Iranian radio and television presenters
Iranian secularists
Iranian LGBT rights activists
Ludwig Maximilian University of Munich alumni
Male murder victims
Persian-language poets
People murdered in Germany
People from Tafresh
Taraneh Records artists
Unsolved murders in Germany
Poets from Tehran